Malaza carmides is a butterfly in the family Hesperiidae. It is found on Madagascar (except the south). The habitat consists of forests, secondary forests and forest margins.

References

Butterflies described in 1868
Erionotini
Butterflies of Africa
Taxa named by William Chapman Hewitson